Puss 'n Boots: Pero's Great Adventure is a video game released in 1990 by Electro Brain for the NES. There was a Japan-only game called Nagagutsu o Haita Neko: Sekai Isshū 80 Nichi Dai Bōken (長靴をはいた猫 世界一周８０日大冒険) from 1986. It was loosely based on Jules Verne's book Around the World in Eighty Days. Pero's name is also "Perrault" in the Japanese game. The character Pero, who is Toei Animation's mascot, is based on the cat from the folktale entitled "Puss in Boots" by Charles Perrault. The game's title comes from that story as well.

Story
As quoted from the manual:

Count Gruemon, a notorious swine, hated mice with a passion. One day, he discovered a mouse in his castle. Frustrated and irate, Count Gruemon ordered Puss 'N Boots (Pero) to find and destroy the mouse. However, Pero was a kind-hearted cat and had become friends with the mouse, and so, helped the little creature to escape. In a fit of anger, Count Gruemon, aided by Dr. Gari-gari, a fiendish scientist wolf, sent Pero on a perilous time-travel journey around the world and into the past.

Pero must locate and defeat Count Gruemon and the mad Dr. Gari-gari, and use their time machine to get home - or be stuck in the past forever. To make matters worse, the Cat Kingdom has sent Killers after Pero because he helped a mouse and thereby violated Cat Kingdom Law. Pero must travel to exotic lands and overcome many hazards, but can he defeat the combined might of the diabolical Count Gruemon, Dr. Gari-gari, and the Killers?

Note: In the original film, Count Gruemon was called Count Gourmon.

Gameplay
The objective of each stage is to simply reach the end and defeat the boss (where applicable). There are quite a few enemies along the way, but Pero has three weapons to choose from. A weapon may be selected by pausing the game and moving the control pad to the right or left until the player finds the desired weapon. All vehicles in the stages that use them have weapons Pero may use. Pero has 3 lives, and the game allows three continues until forcing you to start at the first level.

See also
 The Wonderful World of Puss 'n Boots
 Captain N: The Game Master

External links
 Once Upon a Time Machine synopsis - a more detailed synopsis of the Captain N episode

1990 video games
Electro Brain games
Nintendo Entertainment System games
Nintendo Entertainment System-only games
North America-exclusive video games
Platform games
Shouei games
Single-player video games
Toei Animation video game projects
Video games about cats
Video games about time travel
Video games based on fairy tales
Video games developed in Japan
Video games set in Africa
Video games set in England
Video games set in Japan
Video games set in Saudi Arabia
Video games set in the United States
Western (genre) video games
Works based on Puss in Boots